This is a list of the native mammal species recorded in Argentina. As of January 2020, the list contains 402 mammal species from Argentina, of which one is extinct, seven are critically endangered, seventeen are endangered, sixteen are vulnerable, and thirty are near threatened.

The following tags are used to highlight each species' conservation status as assessed by the International Union for Conservation of Nature; those on the left are used here, those in the second column in some other articles:

Subclass: Theria

Infraclass: Metatheria

Superorder: Ameridelphia

Order: Didelphimorphia (common opossums)

Didelphimorphia is the order of common opossums of the Western Hemisphere. Opossums probably diverged from the basic South American marsupials in the late Cretaceous or early Paleocene. They are small to medium-sized marsupials, about the size of a large house cat, with a long snout and prehensile tail.

Family: Didelphidae (American opossums)
Subfamily: Caluromyinae
Genus: Caluromys
 Brown-eared woolly opossum, C. lanatus LC
Subfamily: Didelphinae
Genus: Chacodelphys
 Chacoan pygmy opossum, Chacodelphys formosa NT
Genus: Chironectes
 Water opossum, Chironectes minimus LC
Genus: Cryptonanus
 Chacoan gracile opossum, Cryptonanus chacoensis LC
 Red-bellied gracile opossum, Cryptonanus ignitus 
Genus: Didelphis
 White-eared opossum, Didelphis albiventris LC
 Big-eared opossum, Didelphis aurita LC
Genus: Gracilinanus
 Agile gracile opossum, Gracilinanus agilis LC
 Brazilian gracile opossum, Gracilinanus microtarsus LC
Genus: Lestodelphys
 Patagonian opossum, Lestodelphys halli LC
Genus: Lutreolina
 Big lutrine opossum, Lutreolina crassicaudata LC
 Massoia's lutrine opossum, Lutreolina massoia LC
Genus: Marmosa
Subgenus: Micoureus
 White-bellied woolly mouse opossum, Marmosa constantiae LC
 Tate's woolly mouse opossum, Marmosa paraguayana LC
Genus: Metachirus
 Brown four-eyed opossum, Metachirus nudicaudatus LC
Genus: Monodelphis
 Yellow-sided opossum, Monodelphis dimidiata LC
 Gray short-tailed opossum, Monodelphis domestica LC
 Pygmy short-tailed opossum, Monodelphis kunsi LC
 Long-nosed short-tailed opossum, Monodelphis scalops LC
 Southern red-sided opossum, Monodelphis sorex LC
 One-striped opossum, Monodelphis unistriata CR
Genus: Philander
 Southeastern four-eyed opossum, Philander frenata LC
Genus: Thylamys
 Cinderella fat-tailed mouse opossum, Thylamys cinderella LC
 Elegant fat-tailed mouse opossum, Thylamys elegans LC
 White-bellied fat-tailed mouse opossum, Thylamys pallidior LC
 Common fat-tailed mouse opossum, Thylamys pusillus LC
 Argentine fat-tailed mouse opossum, Thylamys sponsorius LC
 Buff-bellied fat-tailed mouse opossum, Thylamys venustus DD

Order: Paucituberculata (shrew opossums)

There are six extant species of shrew opossum. They are small shrew-like marsupials confined to the Andes.
Family: Caenolestidae
Genus: Rhyncholestes
Long-nosed caenolestid, Rhyncholestes raphanurus NT

Superorder: Australidelphia

Order: Microbiotheria (monito del monte)

The monito del monte is the only extant member of its family and the only surviving member of an ancient order, Microbiotheria. It appears to be more closely related to Australian marsupials than to other Neotropic marsupials; this is a reflection of the South American origin of all Australasian marsupials.

Family: Microbiotheriidae
Genus: Dromiciops
 Monito del monte, D. gliroides

Infraclass: Eutheria

Superorder: Xenarthra

Order: Cingulata (armadillos)

Armadillos are small mammals with a bony armored shell. There are 21 extant species in the Americas, 19 of which are only found in South America, where they originated. Their much larger relatives, the pampatheres and glyptodonts, once lived in North and South America but became extinct following the appearance of humans.

Family: Dasypodidae (long-nosed armadillos)
Subfamily: Dasypodinae
Genus: Dasypus
 Southern long-nosed armadillo, Dasypus hybridus NT
 Nine-banded armadillo, Dasypus novemcinctus LC
 Seven-banded armadillo, Dasypus septemcinctus LC
 Yepes's mulita, Dasypus yepesi DD
Family: Chlamyphoridae (armadillos)
Subfamily Chlamyphorinae
Genus: Calyptophractus
 Greater fairy armadillo, Calyptophractus retusus DD
Genus: Chlamyphorus
 Pink fairy armadillo, Chlamyphorus truncatus DD
Subfamily: Euphractinae
Genus: Chaetophractus
 Andean hairy armadillo, Chaetophractus nationi NE
 Screaming hairy armadillo, Chaetophractus vellerosus LC
 Big hairy armadillo, Chaetophractus villosus LC
Genus: Euphractus
 Six-banded armadillo, Euphractus sexcinctus LC
Genus: Zaedyus
 Pichi, Zaedyus pichiy NT
Subfamily: Tolypeutinae
Genus: Cabassous
 Chacoan naked-tailed armadillo, Cabassous chacoensis NT
 Greater naked-tailed armadillo, Cabassous tatouay LC
Genus: Priodontes
 Giant armadillo, Priodontes maximus VU
Genus: Tolypeutes
 Southern three-banded armadillo, Tolypeutes matacus NT

Order: Pilosa (anteaters, sloths and tamanduas)

The order Pilosa is extant only in the Americas and includes the anteaters, sloths, and tamanduas. Their ancestral home is South America. Numerous ground sloths, some of which reached the size of elephants, were once present in both North and South America, as well as on the Antilles, but all went extinct following the arrival of humans.

Suborder: Folivora
Family: Bradypodidae (three-toed sloths)
Genus: Bradypus
 Brown-throated sloth, Bradypus variegatus LC possibly extirpated
Suborder: Vermilingua
Family: Myrmecophagidae (American anteaters)
Genus: Myrmecophaga
 Giant anteater, Myrmecophaga tridactyla VU
Genus: Tamandua
 Southern tamandua, Tamandua tetradactyla LC

Superorder: Euarchontoglires

Order: Primates

The order Primates contains humans and their closest relatives: lemurs, lorisoids, tarsiers, monkeys, and apes.

Suborder: Haplorhini
Infraorder: Simiiformes
Parvorder: Platyrrhini
Family: Cebidae
Subfamily: Cebinae
Genus: Sapajus
 Black-striped capuchin, Sapajus libidinosus NT
 Black capuchin, Sapajus nigritus NT
Family: Aotidae
Genus: Aotus
 Azara's night monkey, Aotus azarae LC
Family: Atelidae
Subfamily: Alouattinae
Genus: Alouatta
 Black howler, Alouatta caraya LC
 Brown howler, Alouatta guariba LC

Order: Rodentia (rodents)

Rodents make up the largest order of mammals, with over 40 percent of mammalian species. They have two incisors in the upper and lower jaw which grow continually and must be kept short by gnawing. Most rodents are small though the capybara can weigh up to 45 kg (100 lb).

Suborder: Hystricomorpha
Family: Erethizontidae (New World porcupines)
Subfamily: Erethizontinae
Genus: Coendou
Bicolored-spined porcupine, Coendou bicolor LC
Brazilian porcupine, Coendou prehensilis LC
Paraguaian hairy dwarf porcupine, Coendou spinosus LC
Family: Chinchillidae (viscachas and chinchillas)
Genus: Chinchilla
 Short-tailed chinchilla, Chinchilla chinchilla EN
Genus: Lagidium
 Southern viscacha, Lagidium viscacia LC
 Wolffsohn's viscacha, Lagidium wolffsohni DD
Genus: Lagostomus
 Plains viscacha, Lagostomus maximus LC
Family: Caviidae (guinea pigs)
Subfamily: Caviinae
Genus: Cavia
 Brazilian guinea pig, Cavia aperea LC
 Montane guinea pig, Cavia tschudii LC
Genus: Galea
 Common yellow-toothed cavy, Galea musteloides LC
Genus: Microcavia
 Southern mountain cavy, Microcavia australis LC
 Shipton's mountain cavy, Microcavia shiptoni NT
Subfamily: Dolichotinae
Genus: Dolichotis
 Patagonian mara, Dolichotis patagonum NT
 Chacoan mara, Dolichotis salinicola LC
Subfamily: Hydrochoerinae (capybaras and rock cavies)
Genus: Hydrochoerus
 Capybara, Hydrochoerus hydrochaeris LC
Family: Dasyproctidae (agoutis and pacas)
Genus: Dasyprocta
 Azara's agouti, Dasyprocta azarae DD
 Central American agouti, Dasyprocta punctata LC
Family: Cuniculidae
Genus: Cuniculus
 Lowland paca, Cuniculus paca LC
Family: Ctenomyidae
Genus: Ctenomys
 Argentine tuco-tuco, Ctenomys argentinus NT
 Southern tuco-tuco, Ctenomys australis EN
 Azara's tuco-tuco, Ctenomys azarae EN
 Berg's tuco-tuco, Ctenomys bergi EN
 Bolivian tuco-tuco, Ctenomys boliviensis LC
 Bonetto's tuco-tuco, Ctenomys bonettoi EN
 Budin's tuco-tuco, Ctenomys budini NE
 Colburn's tuco-tuco, Ctenomys colburni DD
 Puntilla tuco-tuco, Ctenomys coludo DD
 Conover's tuco-tuco, Ctenomys conoveri LC
 D'Orbigny's tuco-tuco, Ctenomys dorbignyi NT
 Emily's tuco-tuco, Ctenomys emilianus LC
 Famatina tuco-tuco, Ctenomys famosus DD
 Foch's tuco-tuco, Ctenomys fochi DD
 Lago Blanco tuco-tuco, Ctenomys fodax DD
 Reddish tuco-tuco, Ctenomys frater LC
 Tawny tuco-tuco, Ctenomys fulvus DD
 Haig's tuco-tuco, Ctenomys haigi LC
 San Juan tuco-tuco, Ctenomys johannis DD
 Jujuy tuco-tuco, Ctenomys juris DD
 Catamarca tuco-tuco, Ctenomys knighti DD
 Mottled tuco-tuco, Ctenomys latro EN
 Magellanic tuco-tuco, Ctenomys magellanicus LC
 Maule tuco-tuco, Ctenomys maulinus LC
 Mendoza tuco-tuco, Ctenomys mendocinus LC
 Tiny tuco-tuco, Ctenomys minutus DD
 Furtive tuco-tuco, Ctenomys occultus EN
 Highland tuco-tuco, Ctenomys opimus LC
 Reig's tuco-tuco, Ctenomys osvaldoreigi CR
 Goya tuco-tuco, Ctenomys perrensis LC
 San Luis tuco-tuco, Ctenomys pontifex DD
 Porteous's tuco-tuco, Ctenomys porteousi NT
 Pundt's tuco-tuco, Ctenomys pundti EN
 Rio Negro tuco-tuco, Ctenomys rionegrensis EN
 Roig's tuco-tuco, Ctenomys roigi CR
 Salta tuco-tuco, Ctenomys saltarius DD
 Scaglia's tuco-tuco, Ctenomys scagliai DD
 Silky tuco-tuco, Ctenomys sericeus DD
 Social tuco-tuco, Ctenomys sociabilis CR
 Forest tuco-tuco, Ctenomys sylvanus DD
 Talas tuco-tuco, Ctenomys talarum LC
 Collared tuco-tuco, Ctenomys torquatus LC
 Robust tuco-tuco, Ctenomys tuconax DD
 Tucuman tuco-tuco, Ctenomys tucumanus DD
 Sierra Tontal tuco-tuco, Ctenomys tulduco DD
 Strong tuco-tuco, Ctenomys validus DD
 Vipos tuco-tuco, Ctenomys viperinus DD
 Yolanda's tuco-tuco, Ctenomys yolandae DD
Family: Octodontidae
Genus: Aconaemys
 Chilean rock rat, Aconaemys fuscus LC
 Sage's rock rat, Aconaemys sagei DD
Genus: Octodon
 Bridges's degu, Octodon bridgesi VU
Genus: Octodontomys
 Mountain degu, Octodontomys gliroides LC
Genus: Octomys
 Mountain viscacha rat, Octomys mimax LC
Genus: Pipanacoctomys
 Golden viscacha rat, Pipanacoctomys aureus CR
Genus: Tympanoctomys
 Plains viscacha rat, Tympanoctomys barrerae NT
 Kirchner's viscacha rat, Tympanoctomys kirchnerorum DD
 Chalchalero viscacha rat, Tympanoctomys loschalchalerosorum CR
Family: Abrocomidae
Genus: Abrocoma
 Budin's chinchilla rat, Abrocoma budini DD
 Ashy chinchilla rat, Abrocoma cinerea LC
 Famatina chinchilla rat, Abrocoma famatina DD
 Sierra del Tontal chinchilla rat, Abrocoma shistacea LC
 Uspallata chinchilla rat, Abrocoma uspallata DD
 Punta de Vacas chinchilla rat, Abrocoma vaccarum DD
Family: Echimyidae
Subfamily: Dactylomyinae
Genus: Kannabateomys
 Atlantic bamboo rat, Kannabateomys amblyonyx LC
Subfamily: Eumysopinae
Genus: Euryzygomatomys
 Fischer's guiara, Euryzygomatomys spinosus LC
Family: Myocastoridae (coypus)
Genus: Myocastor
 Coypu, Myocastor coypus LC

Suborder: Sciurognathi
Family: Castoridae (beavers)
Genus: Castor
 American beaver, C. canadensis  introduced
Family: Sciuridae (squirrels)
Subfamily: Sciurinae
Tribe: Sciurini
Genus: Sciurus
 Brazilian squirrel, Sciurus aestuans LC
 Bolivian squirrel, Sciurus ignitus LC

Family: Cricetidae
Subfamily: Sigmodontinae
Genus: Abrawayaomys
 Abrawayaomys chebezi DD
 Ruschi's rat, Abrawayaomys ruschii LC
Genus: Abrothrix
 Andean Altiplano mouse, Abrothrix andinus LC
 Gray grass mouse, Abrothrix illuteus LC
 Jelski's Altiplano mouse, Abrothrix jelskii LC
 Woolly grass mouse, Abrothrix lanosus LC
 Long-haired grass mouse, Abrothrix longipilis LC
 Olive grass mouse, Abrothrix olivaceus LC
 Sanborn's grass mouse, Abrothrix sanborni NT
Genus: Akodon
 White-bellied grass mouse, Akodon albiventer LC
 Azara's grass mouse, Akodon azarae LC
 Bolivian grass mouse, Akodon boliviensis LC
 Budin's grass mouse, Akodon budini LC
 Akodon caenosus DD
 Cursor grass mouse, Akodon cursor LC
 Dolorous grass mouse, Akodon dolores LC
 Smoky grass mouse, Akodon fumeus LC
 Akodon glaucinus
 Intelligent grass mouse, Akodon iniscatus LC
 Altiplano grass mouse, Akodon lutescens LC
 Montane grass mouse, Akodon montensis LC
 Neuquén grass mouse, Akodon neocenus NE
 Paraná grass mouse, Akodon paranaensis LC
 Philip Myers's akodont, Akodon philipmyersi DD
 Akodon polopi LC
 White-throated grass mouse, Akodon simulator LC
 Spegazzini's grass mouse, Akodon spegazzinii LC
 Forest grass mouse, Akodon sylvanus LC
 Akodon tartareus
 Chaco grass mouse, Akodon toba LC
Genus: Andalgalomys
 Olrog's chaco mouse, Andalgalomys olrogi LC
Genus: Andinomys
 Andean mouse, Andinomys edax LC
Genus: Auliscomys
 Andean big-eared mouse, Auliscomys sublimis LC
Genus: Bibimys
 Chaco crimson-nosed rat, Bibimys chacoensis LC
 Large-lipped crimson-nosed rat, Bibimys labiosus LC
 Torres' crimson-nosed rat, Bibimys torresi VU
Genus: Blarinomys
 Brazilian shrew-mouse, Blarinomys breviceps LC
Genus: Brucepattersonius
 Guaraní brucie, Brucepattersonius guarani DD
 Ihering's hocicudo, Brucepattersonius iheringi LC
 Misiones brucie, Brucepattersonius misionensis DD
 Arroyo of Paradise brucie, Brucepattersonius paradisus DD
Genus: Calomys
 Bolivian vesper mouse, Calomys boliviae LC
 Crafty vesper mouse, Calomys callidus LC
 Large vesper mouse, Calomys callosus LC
 Small vesper mouse, Calomys laucha LC
 Andean vesper mouse, Calomys lepidus LC
 Drylands vesper mouse, Calomys musculinus LC
 Delicate vesper mouse, Calomys tener LC
 Córdoba vesper mouse, Calomys venustus LC
Genus: Chelemys
 Andean long-clawed mouse, Chelemys macronyx LC
Genus: Chinchillula
 Altiplano chinchilla mouse, Chinchillula sahamae LC
Genus: Delomys
 Striped Atlantic Forest rat, Delomys dorsalis LC
Genus: Deltamys
 Kemp's grass mouse, Deltamys kempi LC
Genus: Eligmodontia
 Monte gerbil mouse, Eligmodontia moreni LC
 Morgan's gerbil mouse, Eligmodontia morgani LC
 Andean gerbil mouse, Eligmodontia puerulus LC
 Highland gerbil mouse, Eastern Patagonian gerbil mouse, Eligmodontia typus LC
Genus: Euneomys
 Patagonian chinchilla mouse, Euneomys chinchilloides DD
 Burrowing chinchilla mouse, Euneomys fossor DD
 Biting chinchilla mouse, Euneomys mordax LC
 Peterson's chinchilla mouse, Euneomys petersoni LC
Genus: Euryoryzomys
 Tarija rice rat, Euryoryzomys legatus LC
 Russet rice rat, Euryoryzomys russatus LC
Genus: Geoxus
 Long-clawed mole mouse, Geoxus valdivianus LC
Genus: Graomys
 Graomys chacoensis (contains the former Graomys centralis) DD
 Pale leaf-eared mouse, Graomys domorum LC
 Edith's leaf-eared mouse, Graomys edithae DD
 Gray leaf-eared mouse, Graomys griseoflavus LC
Genus: Holochilus
 Web-footed marsh rat, Holochilus brasiliensis LC
 Chaco marsh rat, Holochilus chacarius LC
Genus: Irenomys
 Chilean climbing mouse, Irenomys tarsalis LC
Genus: Juliomys
 Lesser Wilfred's mouse, Juliomys pictipes LC
Genus: Gyldenstolpia
 Fossorial giant rat, Gyldenstolpia fronto CR
Genus: Loxodontomys
 Southern big-eared mouse, Loxodontomys micropus LC
Genus: Necromys
 Argentine bolo mouse, Necromys benefactus LC
 Rufous-bellied bolo mouse, Necromys lactens LC
 Hairy-tailed bolo mouse, Necromys lasiurus LC
 Paraguayan bolo mouse, Necromys lenguarum LC
 Dark bolo mouse, Necromys obscurus LC
 Temchuk's bolo mouse, Necromys temchuki LC
Genus: Nectomys
 Scaly-footed water rat, Nectomys squamipes LC
Genus: Neotomys
 Andean swamp rat, Neotomys ebriosus LC
Genus: Notiomys
 Edward's long-clawed mouse, Notiomys edwardsii LC
Genus: Oligoryzomys
 Brenda's colilargo, Oligoryzomys brendae DD
 Chacoan pygmy rice rat, Oligoryzomys chacoensis LC
 Destructive pygmy rice rat, Oligoryzomys destructor LC
 Yellow pygmy rice rat, Oligoryzomys flavescens LC
 Fornes' colilargo, Oligoryzomys fornesi LC
 Long-tailed pygmy rice rat, Oligoryzomys longicaudatus LC
 Magellanic pygmy rice rat, Oligoryzomys magellanicus LC
 Black-footed pygmy rice rat, Oligoryzomys nigripes LC
Genus: Oxymycterus
 Argentine hocicudo, Oxymycterus akodontius NE
 Hispid hocicudo, Oxymycterus hispidus LC
 Paramo hocicudo, Oxymycterus paramensis LC
 Quaestor hocicudo, Oxymycterus quaestor LC
 Red hocicudo, Oxymycterus rufus LC
Genus: Phyllotis
 Los Alisos leaf-eared mouse, Phyllotis alisosiensis DD
 Anita's leaf-eared mouse, Phyllotis anitae DD
 Buenos Aires leaf-eared mouse, Phyllotis bonariensis NT
 Capricorn leaf-eared mouse, Phyllotis caprinus LC
 Bunchgrass leaf-eared mouse, Phyllotis osilae LC
 Yellow-rumped leaf-eared mouse, Phyllotis xanthopygus LC
Genus: Pseudoryzomys
 Brazilian false rice rat, Pseudoryzomys simplex LC
Genus: Reithrodon
 Bunny rat, Reithrodon auritus LC
 Naked-soled conyrat, Reithrodon typicus LC
Genus: Rhipidomys
 Southern climbing mouse, Rhipidomys austrinus LC
Genus: Salinomys
 Delicate salt flat mouse, Salinomys delicatus DD
Genus: Scapteromys
 Argentine swamp rat, Scapteromys aquaticus LC
 Waterhouse's swamp rat, Scapteromys tumidus LC
Genus: Sooretamys
 Paraguayan rice rat, Sooretamys angouya LC
Genus: Tapecomys
 Primordial tapecua, Tapecomys primus LC
Genus: Thaptomys
 Blackish grass mouse, Thaptomys nigrita LC

Order: Lagomorpha (lagomorphs)

The lagomorphs comprise two families, Leporidae (hares and rabbits), and Ochotonidae (pikas). Though they can resemble rodents, and were classified as a superfamily in that order until the early 20th century, they have since been considered a separate order. They differ from rodents in a number of physical characteristics, such as having four incisors in the upper jaw rather than two.

Family: Leporidae (rabbits, hares)
Genus: Sylvilagus
 Common tapetí, Sylvilagus brasiliensis EN

Superorder: Laurasiatheria

Order: Chiroptera (bats)

The bats' most distinguishing feature is that their forelimbs are developed as wings, making them the only mammals capable of flight. Bat species account for about 20% of all mammals.

Family: Noctilionidae
Genus: Noctilio
 Lesser bulldog bat, N. albiventris LC
 Greater bulldog bat, N. leporinus LC
Family: Vespertilionidae
Subfamily: Myotinae
Genus: Myotis
 Southern myotis, Myotis aelleni DD
 Silver-tipped myotis, Myotis albescens LC
 Chilean myotis, Myotis chiloensis LC
 Myotis dinellii LC
 Hairy-legged myotis, Myotis keaysi LC
 Yellowish myotis, Myotis levis LC
 Black myotis, Myotis nigricans LC
 Riparian myotis, Myotis riparius LC
 Red myotis, Myotis ruber NT
 Velvety myotis, Myotis simus DD
Subfamily: Vespertilioninae
Genus: Eptesicus
 Brazilian brown bat, Eptesicus brasiliensis LC
 Diminutive serotine, Eptesicus diminutus LC
 Argentine brown bat, Eptesicus furinalis LC
Genus: Histiotus
 Thomas's big-eared brown bat, Histiotus laephotis LC
 Big-eared brown bat, Histiotus macrotus LC
 Southern big-eared brown bat, Histiotus magellanicus LC
 Small big-eared brown bat, Histiotus montanus LC
 Tropical big-eared brown bat, Histiotus velatus DD
Genus: Lasiurus
 Desert red bat, Lasiurus blossevillii LC
 Hoary bat, Lasiurus cinereus LC
 Southern yellow bat, Lasiurus ega LC
 Cinnamon red bat, Lasiurus varius LC
Family: Molossidae
Genus: Cynomops
 Cinnamon dog-faced bat, Cynomops abrasus DD
 Para dog-faced bat, Cynomops paranus DD
 Southern dog-faced bat, Cynomops planirostris LC
Genus: Eumops
 Black bonneted bat, Eumops auripendulus LC
 Dwarf bonneted bat, Eumops bonariensis LC
 Big bonneted bat, Eumops dabbenei LC
 Wagner's bonneted bat, Eumops glaucinus LC
 Patagonian bonneted bat, Eumops patagonicus LC
 Western mastiff bat, Eumops perotis LC
Genus: Molossops
 Rufous dog-faced bat, Molossops neglectus DD
 Dwarf dog-faced bat, Molossops temminckii LC
Genus: Molossus
 Bonda mastiff bat, Molossus currentium LC
 Velvety free-tailed bat, Molossus molossus LC
 Black mastiff bat, Molossus rufus LC
Genus: Nyctinomops
 Broad-eared bat, Nyctinomops laticaudatus LC
 Big free-tailed bat, Nyctinomops macrotis LC
Genus: Promops
 Big crested mastiff bat, Promops centralis LC
 Brown mastiff bat, Promops nasutus LC
Genus: Tadarida
 Mexican free-tailed bat, Tadarida brasiliensis LC
Family: Phyllostomidae
Subfamily: Phyllostominae
Genus: Chrotopterus
 Big-eared woolly bat, Chrotopterus auritus LC
Genus: Macrophyllum
 Long-legged bat, Macrophyllum macrophyllum LC
Genus: Phyllostomus
 Pale spear-nosed bat, Phyllostomus discolor LC
Genus: Tonatia
 Greater round-eared bat, Tonatia bidens DD
Subfamily: Glossophaginae
Genus: Anoura
 Tailed tailless bat, Anoura caudifer LC
Genus: Glossophaga
 Pallas's long-tongued bat, Glossophaga soricina LC
Subfamily: Carolliinae
Genus: Carollia
 Seba's short-tailed bat, Carollia perspicillata LC
Subfamily: Stenodermatinae
Genus: Artibeus
 Fringed fruit-eating bat, Artibeus fimbriatus LC
 Great fruit-eating bat, Artibeus lituratus LC
 Flat-faced fruit-eating bat, Artibeus planirostris LC
Genus: Platyrrhinus
 White-lined broad-nosed bat, Platyrrhinus lineatus LC
Genus: Pygoderma
 Ipanema bat, Pygoderma bilabiatum LC
Genus: Sturnira
 Hairy yellow-shouldered bat, Sturnira erythromos LC
 Little yellow-shouldered bat, Sturnira lilium LC
 Tschudi's yellow-shouldered bat, Sturnira oporaphilum LC
Genus: Vampyressa
 Southern little yellow-eared bat, Vampyressa pusilla DD
Subfamily: Desmodontinae
Genus: Desmodus
 Common vampire bat, Desmodus rotundus LC
Genus: Diaemus
 White-winged vampire bat, Diaemus youngi LC

Order: Carnivora (carnivorans)

There are over 260 species of carnivorans, the majority of which feed primarily on meat. They have a characteristic skull shape and dentition.
Suborder: Feliformia
Family: Felidae (cats)
Subfamily: Felinae
Genus: Herpailurus
Jaguarundi, H. yagouaroundi 
Genus: Leopardus
Pampas cat L. colocola 
Geoffroy's cat L. geoffroyi 
Kodkod, L. guigna 
Southern tigrina L. guttulus 
Andean mountain cat L. jacobitus 
Ocelot L. pardalis 
Oncilla L. tigrinus 
Margay L. wiedii 
Genus: Puma
Cougar, P. concolor 
Subfamily: Pantherinae
Genus: Panthera
Jaguar, P. onca 
Suborder: Caniformia
Family: Canidae (dogs, foxes)
Genus: Dusicyon
 Dusicyon avus 
Genus: Lycalopex
 Culpeo, Lycalopex culpaeus LC
 South American gray fox, Lycalopex griseus LC
 Pampas fox, Lycalopex gymnocercus LC
Genus: Cerdocyon
 Crab-eating fox, Cerdocyon thous LC
Genus: Speothos
 Bush dog, Speothos venaticus NT
Genus: Chrysocyon
 Maned wolf, Chrysocyon brachyurus NT
Family: Ursidae (bears)
Genus: Tremarctos
 Spectacled bear, Tremarctos ornatus VU presence uncertain, possible vagrant
Family: Procyonidae (raccoons)
Genus: Procyon
 Crab-eating raccoon, Procyon cancrivorus LC
Genus: Nasua
 South American coati, Nasua nasua LC
Family: Mustelidae (mustelids)
Genus: Eira
 Tayra, Eira barbara LC
Genus: Galictis
Lesser grison, Galictis cuja LC
Greater grison, Galictis vittata LC
Genus: Lyncodon
 Patagonian weasel, Lyncodon patagonicus LC
Genus: Lontra
 Marine otter, Lontra felina EN
 Neotropical river otter, Lontra longicaudis NT
 Southern river otter, Lontra provocax EN
Genus: Neogale
 American mink, N. vison LC introduced
Genus: Pteronura
 Giant otter, Pteronura brasiliensis EN presence uncertain
Family: Mephitidae
Genus: Conepatus
 Molina's hog-nosed skunk, Conepatus chinga LC
 Humboldt's hog-nosed skunk, Conepatus humboldtii LC
Clade: Pinnipedia (seals, sea lions, walruses)
Family: Otariidae (eared seals, sea lions)
Genus: Arctocephalus
 South American fur seal, Arctocephalus australis LC
 Subantarctic fur seal, Arctocephalus tropicalis LC
Genus: Otaria
 South American sea lion, Otaria flavescens LC
Family: Phocidae (earless seals)
Genus: Leptonychotes
 Weddell seal, Leptonychotes weddellii LC
Genus: Lobodon
 Crabeater seal, Lobodon carcinophaga LC
Genus: Mirounga
 Southern elephant seal, Mirounga leonina LC

Order: Perissodactyla (odd-toed ungulates)

The odd-toed ungulates are browsing and grazing mammals. They are usually large to very large, and have relatively simple stomachs and a large middle toe. South America once had a great diversity of ungulates of native origin, but these dwindled after the interchange with North America, and disappeared entirely following the arrival of humans. Sequencing of collagen from fossils of one recently extinct species each of notoungulates and litopterns has indicated that these orders comprise a sister group to the perissodactyls.

Family: Tapiridae (tapirs)
Genus: Tapirus
 Lowland tapir, Tapirus terrestris VU

Order: Artiodactyla (even-toed ungulates and cetaceans)

The weight of even-toed ungulates is borne about equally by the third and fourth toes, rather than mostly or entirely by the third as in perissodactyls. There are about 220 noncetacean artiodactyl species, including many that are of great economic importance to humans.

Family: Bovidae (bovids)
Subfamily: Antilopinae
Genus: Antilope
 Blackbuck, A. cervicapra  introduced
Subfamily: Caprinae
Genus: Hemitragus
 Himalayan tahr, H. jemlahicus  introduced, possibly extirpated
Family: Tayassuidae (peccaries)
Genus: Catagonus
 Chacoan peccary, Catagonus wagneri EN
Genus: Dicotyles
 Collared peccary, Dicotyles tajacu LC
Genus: Tayassu
 White-lipped peccary, Tayassu pecari VU
Family: Camelidae (camels, llamas)
Genus: Lama
 Guanaco, Lama guanicoe LC
 Vicuña, Lama vicugna LC
Family: Cervidae (deer)
Subfamily: Capreolinae
Genus: Blastocerus
 Marsh deer, Blastocerus dichotomus VU
Genus: Hippocamelus
 Taruca, Hippocamelus antisensis VU
 South Andean deer, Hippocamelus bisulcus EN
Genus: Mazama
 Red brocket, Mazama americana DD
 Gray brocket, Mazama gouazoupira LC
 Pygmy brocket, Mazama nana VU
Genus: Odocoileus
 Mule deer, O. hemionus LC introduced
Genus: Ozotoceros
 Pampas deer, Ozotoceros bezoarticus NT
Genus: Pudú
 Southern pudú, P. puda NT
Subfamily: Cervinae
Genus: Dama
 European fallow deer, D. dama LC introduced

Order: Cetacea (whales, dolphins and porpoises)

The infraorder Cetacea includes whales, dolphins and porpoises. They are the mammals most fully adapted to aquatic life with a spindle-shaped nearly hairless body, protected by a thick layer of blubber, and forelimbs and tail modified to provide propulsion underwater. Their closest extant relatives are the hippos, which are artiodactyls, from which cetaceans descended; cetaceans are thus also artiodactyls.

Parvorder: Mysticeti
Family: Balaenidae
Genus: Eubalaena
 Southern right whale, Eubalaena australis LC
Family: Balaenopteridae
Subfamily: Balaenopterinae
Genus: Balaenoptera
 Common minke whale, Balaenoptera acutorostrata LC
 Antarctic minke whale, Balaenoptera bonaerensis NT
 Sei whale, Balaenoptera borealis EN
 Bryde's whale, Balaenoptera edeni NE
 Blue whale, Balaenoptera musculus EN
 Fin whale, Balaenoptera physalus VU
Subfamily: Megapterinae
Genus: Megaptera
 Humpback whale, Megaptera novaeangliae LC
Family: Neobalaenidae
Genus: Caperea
 Pygmy right whale, Caperea marginata LC
Parvorder: Odontoceti
Family: Physeteridae
Genus: Physeter
 Sperm whale, Physeter macrocephalus VU
Family: Kogiidae
Genus: Kogia
 Pygmy sperm whale, Kogia breviceps DD
 Dwarf sperm whale, Kogia sima DD
Family: Ziphidae
Genus: Ziphius
 Cuvier's beaked whale, Ziphius cavirostris LC
Genus: Berardius
 Arnoux's beaked whale, Berardius arnuxii DD
Genus: Tasmacetus
 Shepherd's beaked whale, Tasmacetus shepherdi DD
Subfamily: Hyperoodontinae
Genus: Hyperoodon
 Southern bottlenose whale, Hyperoodon planifrons LC
Genus: Mesoplodon
 Andrews' beaked whale, Mesoplodon bowdoini DD
 Gray's beaked whale, Mesoplodon grayi DD
 Hector's beaked whale, Mesoplodon hectori DD
 Strap-toothed whale, Mesoplodon layardii DD
Superfamily: Inioidea (river dolphins)
Family: Pontoporiidae
Genus: Pontoporia
 La Plata dolphin, Pontoporia blainvillei VU
Superfamily: Delphinoidea
Family: Phocoenidae (porpoises)
Genus: Phocoena
 Spectacled porpoise, Phocoena dioptrica LC
 Burmeister's porpoise, Phocoena spinipinnis NT
Family: Delphinidae (marine dolphins)
Genus: Cephalorhynchus
 Commerson's dolphin, Cephalorhynchus commersonii LC
 Chilean dolphin, Cephalorhynchus eutropia NT
Genus: Tursiops
 Common bottlenose dolphin, Tursiops truncatus LC
Genus: Stenella
 Pantropical spotted dolphin, Stenella attenuata LC
 Striped dolphin, Stenella coeruleoalba LC
 Spinner dolphin, Stenella longirostris LC
Genus: Delphinus
 Long-beaked common dolphin, Delphinus capensis DD
 Short-beaked common dolphin, Delphinus delphis LC
Genus: Lagenodelphis
 Fraser's dolphin, Lagenodelphis hosei LC
Genus: Lissodelphis
 Southern right whale dolphin, Lissodelphis peronii LC
Genus: Lagenorhynchus
 Peale's dolphin, Lagenorhynchus australis LC
 Hourglass dolphin, Lagenorhynchus cruciger LC
 Dusky dolphin, Lagenorhynchus obscurus LC
Genus: Grampus
 Risso's dolphin, Grampus griseus LC
Genus: Orcinus
 Orca, Orcinus orca DD
Genus: Pseudorca
 False killer whale, Pseudorca crassidens NT
Genus: Globicephala
 Long-finned pilot whale, Globicephala melas LC

See also
Environment of Argentina
List of chordate orders
List of mammals in Antarctica
Lists of mammals by region
List of prehistoric mammals
Mammal classification
List of mammals described in the 2000s

Notes

References

External links 

Argentina
Mammals

Argentina